Brooks-Medicine Hat is a provincial electoral district in Alberta, Canada. The district is one of 87 districts mandated to return a single member (MLA) to the Legislative Assembly of Alberta using the first past the post method of voting. It was contested for the first time in the 2019 Alberta election and is presently represented by Premier Danielle Smith.

Geography
The district is located in southeastern Alberta, containing the entirety of Newell County and the northern portions of Cypress County and Medicine Hat. It is named for its two largest communities, Medicine Hat and Brooks, and also contains CFB Suffield. Within the city of Medicine Hat, its border with Cypress-Medicine Hat runs southeast along Highway 1, then northeast along Highway 41A until the railroad tracks, then east along the South Saskatchewan River.

History

The district was created in 2017 when the Electoral Boundaries Commission endeavoured to reduce the number of ridings in southern Alberta, owing to slow population growth in the region. The district was created from the eastern half of Strathmore-Brooks, the northern third of Cypress-Medicine Hat, and some of the northern neighbourhoods previously part of Medicine Hat. Based on Statistics Canada information, in 2017, the Brooks-Medicine Hat electoral district had a population of 51,070, which was 9 per cent above the provincial average of 46,803 for a provincial electoral district.

In the 2019 Alberta general election, United Conservative Party (UCP) candidate Michaela Frey was elected with 61 per cent of the vote, defeating New Democratic Party candidate Lynn MacWilliam with 18 per cent of the vote and four other candidates. Independent candidate Todd Beasley was previously removed from the UCP constituency nomination contest by the party after making comments on social media describing Islam as an "evil cult". On October 7, 2022, Frey resigned her seat in the Legislative Assembly to allow the newly elected leader of the United Conservative Party and premier, Danielle Smith, to seek a seat in legislature. Smith was elected on November 8, 2022.

Electoral results

2022 by-election

2019 general election 

^ UCP change is calculated from combined Wildrose and PC totals.

Notes

References

Alberta provincial electoral districts
Brooks, Alberta
Politics of Medicine Hat